Ranjit Singh Bajwa (born 14 March 1989) known professionally as Ranjit Bawa is an Indian singer and actor associated with Punjabi language music and films. He rose to fame from his single "Jatt Di Akal" which broke many Punjabi records. He made his debut in the 2015 album, Mitti Da Bawa which was awarded the "Best World Album" award in the 2015 Brit Asia TV Music Awards. He has also received "PTC Best Folk oriented Song Award" in 2013 for his Song in 2013, Jatt Di Akal. He made his film debut in playing the title role in Toofan Singh, a semi-biographical film about the 1980s Punjabi activist Shaheed Bhai Jugraj Singh Toofan.

Education
Born in Gurdaspur in Punjab, Bawa did his graduation from Guru Nanak College, Batala and post-graduation at Khalsa College, Amritsar. Bawa did his Masters in Music from Guru Nanak Dev University.

Discography

Studio Albums

Singles Discography
 Jatt Di Akal
 Jean 
 Sadi Wari Aun De
 Shadi Dot Com
 Kankan
 Miti Da Bawa
 Sher Marna
 Google
 Jind Meriya
 Yaari Chadigarh Waliye
 Chandigarh Returns (3 Lakh)
 Jinda Sukha Anthem (with Lehmber Hussainpuri)
 Naal Naal
 Munda Sadara Da
 Azaadi
 Jinde 
 Lahore 

 Yaari Chandigarh waliye
 Mitti da bawa
 Botti Botti
 Sardar
 Dollar Vs Roti
 Bandook
 Jatt Da Dar
 Swag jatt da
 Punjabio Jaagde Ke Sutte
 Jinda Sukha
 Girls Hostel
 Narrow Salwar
 Dc Jatt
 Tankha Ft JRS 
 Qurbani
 Chandigarh Returns
 Sher Marna
 300 Sala Yaad Shaheedi (with Veer Rahimpuri, Tigerstyle & Shiromani Gurdwara Parbandhak Committee)
 Skoda
 Meri Sardarniye
 Chat Purani
 Chad Khera Baniye Da (With Harshdeep Kaur)
 Ja Ve Mundiya
 Hik Vich Zor (With Dr Zeus & Fateh Doe)
 Sarvann Putt
 Ja Ve Mundeya
Phulkari
 Thar
 Heavyweight Bhangra 
  Diljaniya
 Parahune
Weekend
 Kangan
Gurpurab
Badami Rangiye
Jatt Sanjay Dutt
Ditch
Manzil
Chote Chote Ghar (with Gur Sidhu)
Pehchan
Fateh Aa
Kinne Aaye Kinne Gaye 2
Impress
Impress 2
Friend Zone
No Gurantee
Sade Hero
Att Toh Ant
Sucha Soorma
Tu Fikkar Na Kari Ammiye
21 vi Saddi
Punjab Bolda
Depend On Mood
Kinne Aaye Kinne Gaye
Banned
Mahiya
Approach
Khanda
Rabb Ji Aaye Ne
Jatta Ve (ft. Oshin Brar)
Nikli Koi Gal (with Gur Sidhu)

Filmogrpahy

References

External links

1989 births
Living people
Punjabi-language singers
Male actors in Punjabi cinema
21st-century Indian male actors
Male actors from Punjab, India
Bhangra (music) musicians
People from Gurdaspur